Joe Derosa (born August 6, 1977) is an American stand-up comedian, restaurateur and podcaster.

Career

Stand-up comedy, radio, television and film
DeRosa got his start in comedy performing as part of a comedic musical duo called Deep at the New Road Brewhouse in his hometown of Collegeville, Pennsylvania. After the duo split, DeRosa began performing stand-up comedy regularly at the Laff House in Philadelphia. DeRosa moved to New York City, performing regularly in comedy clubs. Beginning in 2006, DeRosa began co-hosting the Uninformed radio show with Bill Burr on Sirius Satellite Radio. The monthly show aired on Saturday nights. After new episodes began airing more sporadically, the show was dropped. It ran as a podcast for several more episodes before ending altogether in 2009.

In 2009, DeRosa starred in his first half-hour Comedy Central Presents special. On June 21, 2010, Comedy Central Records released DeRosa's first album The Depression Auction. DeRosa's second album, Return of the Son of Depression Auction, was released on September 6, 2011. That same year, DeRosa, Burr and Robert Kelly, co-wrote, co-produced and co-starred in a short film titled Cheat which DeRosa also directed.

In August 2012, a four-episode web short series titled Overrated debuted on the Official Comedy YouTube channel and featured DeRosa and Kurt Metzger discussing overrated and underrated pop culture subjects. In October 2012, a six-part web short series titled What Are We Waiting For?, which DeRosa wrote, directed and starred in, debuted on Warner Bros.' The Warner Sound website. The series featured DeRosa as an unnamed, obnoxiously overzealous music fan. Guest stars for the series include Bill Burr, Bonnie McFarlane, Gregg "Opie" Hughes, Anthony Cumia, Jim Norton, Carmine Famiglietti and Mike Robinson. In December 2012, a third web short series titled We Should Break Up starring DeRosa and fellow comedian and former girlfriend, Nikki Glaser, debuted on the Official Comedy channel on YouTube. The six-part series featured DeRosa and Glaser as an on again, off again couple in situations based on actual events that happened during their time as a real-life couple. Besides co-writing and co-starring in the shorts, DeRosa also directed the series.

DeRosa's third album, You Will Die, was released on September 3, 2013. In October 2013, DeRosa relocated from New York City to Los Angeles to take a job as a writer on The Pete Holmes Show which aired from October 28, 2013 through June 18, 2014. DeRosa has also made appearances on comedy series such as Louie, Bored to Death, Inside Amy Schumer and Sullivan & Son. Also in 2013, DeRosa voiced a character named Rufus Bellows in the video game, Grand Theft Auto V and starred in his second half-hour Comedy Central special.

DeRosa's fourth album, Mistakes Were Made: The B Sides, was released on September 2, 2014. In October 2014, DeRosa joined the writing team for the Netflix original series, Wet Hot American Summer: First Day of Camp, a prequel to the film Wet Hot American Summer. 2014 was also the release date for the Bonnie McFarlane film, Women Aren't Funny which DeRosa served as a writer on. In 2015, DeRosa first appeared as Dr. Caldera, a veterinarian with criminal ties, on the AMC television series, Better Call Saul. Caldera was a recurring character throughout the show's six seasons. On November 14, 2015, DeRosa performed at Madison Square Garden as an opening act for Bill Burr. On October 13, 2016, DeRosa taped his first one-hour special for Comedy Central at The Masonic Lodge at the Hollywood Forever Cemetery in Los Angeles, California. The special, titled You Let Me Down, debuted on February 3, 2017. A digital audio version, DeRosa's fifth album,  was released four days later through outlets such as iTunes and Amazon. DeRosa was also the writer of one episode of Comedy Central's Jeff & Some Aliens during its first and only season. The episode, titled "Jeff & Some Confidence", aired on February 15, 2017. Beginning in 2017, DeRosa served as a writer and consultant on Pete Holmes' HBO television series, Crashing during its three-season run.

On February 26, 2018, DeRosa appeared as Gary on the debut episode of Living Biblically, a CBS sitcom created by Patrick Walsh and produced by Johnny Galecki. Additionally, DeRosa executive produced and also starred as The Nocturnal in the horror anthology series, By Night: Origins which became available to stream via Amazon Prime on April 13, 2018. DeRosa's sixth album, I Go To Atlanta All The Time was released on October 31, 2018 and aired exclusively on Sirius XM Satellite Radio's Raw Dog Comedy channel for approximately one year before being made available for purchase on November 15, 2019.

In May 2019, Comedy Central released three weekly shorts titled You Let Me Down. The series, written by and starring DeRosa, is based on his regular column published in Penthouse magazine throughout 2017 and 2018. In late 2019, DeRosa moved back to New York City and resumed working at New York comedy clubs on a full-time basis.

In November 2020, DeRosa partnered with The Stand Comedy Club in New York City to create the pop-up sandwich shop, Joey Roses. Located within the club itself, the eatery offered "neighborhood-style sandwiches." On November 21, 2021, DeRosa partnered with The Stand Comedy Club owner Paul Italia to open Joey Roses Sandwich Shoppe in its own location at 174 Rivington Street in New York City.

Podcasting
From July 2011 through March 2012, DeRosa was the co-host of fellow comedian Robert Kelly's podcast, You Know What Dude? on the Riotcast Network. In February 2014, he began hosting his own podcast, Down With Joe DeRosa, which the next year became part of Al Madrigal and Bill Burr's All Things Comedy podcast network. Soon after, DeRosa noted that he had grown tired of the podcast and its format. He ended the podcast in June 2015 but noted that a new podcast was already planned.

On July 10, 2015, Fangoria announced that DeRosa would co-host a new podcast with writer, Patrick Walsh. The podcast, We'll See You In Hell, has horror films as one of its topics and debuted on August 3, 2015. In 2017 it moved to the HeadGum podcast network due to changes occurring within Fangoria. The show made its return on HeadGum on March 6, 2017. It went on hiatus in May 2018, and returned in September as part of Starburns Audio, the podcast network division of Starburns Industries. The show took another extended hiatus in May 2019. The show resumed on September 2, although it was now no longer attached to any podcast network. It was instead exclusively available only to the show's Patreon subscribers with two episodes being released monthly. In August 2020, an additional tier was made available for subscribers to receive an additional two episodes each month, bringing the total amount of monthly shows to four.

On February 17, 2017 DeRosa debuted another podcast, Emotional Hangs, on Feral Audio. The show, co-hosted with fellow comedian, Kurt Braunohler, began as one of several rotating formats on Braunohler's Nerdist Industries podcast, The K Ohle with Kurt Braunohler before spinning off into its own show. The podcast took a humorous look at forming and maintaining adult male friendships. The podcast has been on hiatus since its December 13, 2017 episode. Initially, the hiatus was due to Braunohler's need to relocate to Montreal for several months but during that time, Feral Audio ceased operation, leaving Emotional Hangs without a network home and no episodes have been released since.

On November 4, 2018, DeRosa and Burr released the first two new episodes of the Uninformed podcast. Two episodes a month, released simultaneously, were made available exclusively to Burr's paid Patreon subscribers. In May 2019, after twelve episodes, it was announced that Burr would no longer be using the Patreon subscription model and that all future episodes, as well as existing ones, would be available for free. No further episodes have been released since August 2019.

Following DeRosa's return to living in New York City, he teamed with fellow New York comedian, Corinne Fisher, for the podcast Without a Country. The taping of the show became a weekly event at the Stand Comedy club as of January 7, 2020, and is released as a weekly podcast. On January 10, 2021, DeRosa announced his departure from Without a Country which would continue airing new episodes without him.

On December 1, 2020 Derosa and Sal Vulcano of Impractical Jokers debuted their podcast network, No Presh Network. The network debuted with two podcasts, Taste Buds featuring DeRosa and Vulcano and Hey Babe! featuring Vulcano and stand-up comedian, Chris Distefano. Both shows release one episode weekly.

Musical projects
DeRosa and childhood friend James Pinkstone formed a comedic sex rap group called Deep. After releasing their debut album, The Game Plan, in 2005 and performing several live shows, the duo felt that people were taking the act too seriously and not understanding that their extreme misogyny was a parody of existing sex rap acts. As a result, the friends disbanded Deep. In 2007, DeRosa and his friend Paul Chell released an album titled Twointheoneinthe under the name Salsa Windfall. In 2009, DeRosa and Pinkstone reunited as an electropop act, named Funeral In The Mirror, to release an album titled Old Wolf Thoughts. In 2012, DeRosa teamed with fellow comedians Bob Place, Ben Evans, Michael Albanese and Jamey McDaniel for a comedy rap video reminiscent of Deep, titled "Grab Dat Dolla" which was released through Laughing Skull Studios' YouTube channel. In January 2016, DeRosa released a five-song digital EP under the name DemonRiot through the Bandcamp website. A second EP, titled Deformed Disco, was made available on the site one month later.

DeRosa has also composed and recorded the theme songs for four of his podcasts, Down With Joe DeRosa, We'll See You In Hell, Emotional Hangs, and Without A Country.

Discography

Filmography

Film

Television

Web series

Video games

References

External links
 Official website
 
 

1977 births
Living people
21st-century American male actors
American male comedians
American male television actors
American television writers
American male television writers
American non-fiction writers
People from Collegeville, Pennsylvania
American producers
American directors
American stand-up comedians
Writers from Philadelphia
Male actors from Philadelphia
21st-century American comedians
Screenwriters from Pennsylvania
21st-century American screenwriters
21st-century American male writers
Male non-fiction writers